This is a list of properties on the National Register of Historic Places in Brookline, Massachusetts.

Current listings

|}

See also

 National Register of Historic Places listings in Norfolk County, Massachusetts

References

Brookline, Massachusetts
Brookline
 
Brookline, Massachusetts